Tindhare Waterfall is a waterfall located in Roshi Rural Municipality of Kavrepalanchok District in Nepal. The name of this waterfall is 'Tindhare' as it falls from the hill of Mahabharat Range in the form of three streams (tin dhārā).

Geography and Tourism
Tindhare waterfall is located at a distance of 30 km from Dhulikhel, the district headquarters of Kavrepalanchok district. This waterfall can be reached by road from Kathmandu via Dhulikhel, Namobuddha Dapcha.

See also
List of waterfalls of Nepal

References

Waterfalls of Nepal